Abkosh (also Romanized as Ābkosh and Ābkash) is a village in Abkosh Rural District, Bord Khun District, Deyr County, Bushehr Province, Iran. At the 2006 census, its population was 819, in 144 families.

References 

Populated places in Deyr County